Stygobromus morrisoni, commonly called Morrison's cave amphipod, is a troglomorphic species of amphipod in family Crangonyctidae. It is native to Virginia and West Virginia, in the United States.

References

Freshwater crustaceans of North America
Cave crustaceans
Crustaceans described in 1967
morrisoni